This is the list of surnames of Georgian people.

A (ა)
 Astanjelovi (ასტანჯელოვი)
 Abakelia (აბაკელია)
 Abashidze (აბაშიძე)
 Abazasdze (აბაზასძე)
 Abkhazi (აფხაზი)
 Abramia (აბრამია)
 Abramidze (აბრამიძე)
 Abuladze (აბულაძე)
 Abuletisdze (აბულეთისძე)
 Abuselidze (აბუსელიძე)
 Agiashvili (აგიაშვილი)
 Akhalkatsi (ახალკაცი)
 Akhalaia (ახალაია)
 Akhaladze (ახალაძე)
 Akhvlediani (ახვლედიანი)
 Alasania (ალასანია)
 Alavidze (ალავიძე)
 Aleksidze (ალექსიძე)
 Altunashvili (ალთუნაშვილი)
 Amilakhvari (ამილახვარი)
 Amirejibi (ამირეჯიბი)
 Amiranashvili (ამირანაშვილი)
 Amirkhanashvili (ამირხანაშვილი)
 Andguladze (ანდღულაძე)
 Anchabadze (ანჩაბაძე)
 Andriadze (ანდრიაძე)
 Andriashvili (ანდრიაშვილი)
 Andronikashvili (ანდრონიკაშვილი)
 Anjaparidze (ანჯაფარიძე)
 Apakidze (აფაქიძე)
 Apkhaidze (აფხაიძე)
 Arabidze (არაბიძე)
 Arakhamia (არახამია)
 Arkania (არქანია)
 Arveladze (არველაძე)
 Arziani (არზიანი)
 Asatiani (ასათიანი)
 Azirashvili (აზირაშვილი)
 Aghoshashvili (აღოშაშვილი)
 Aslanishvili (ასლანიშვილი)
 Avaliani (ავალიანი)
 Avalishvili (ავალიშვილი)
 Atanashvili (ათანაშვილი)

B (ბ)
 Brokishvili (ბროკიშვილი)
 Babadishvili (ბაბადიშვილი)
 Bagrationi (ბაგრატიონი)
 Bagrationi Davitashvili (ბაგრატიონი დავითაშვილი)
 Bagrationi Mukhraneli (ბაგრატიონი მუხრანელი)
 Bakhia (ბახია)
 Bakhsoliani (ბახსოლიანი)
 Bakradze (ბაქრაძე) 
 Bakuradze (ბაკურაძე) 
 Balakhadze (ბალახაძე)
 Balanchivadze (ბალანჩივაძე)
 Balavadze (ბალავაძე)
 Bandzeladze (ბანძელაძე)
 Baratashvili (ბარათაშვილი)
 Barnabishvili (ბარნაბიშვილი)
 Batiashvili (ბათიაშვილი)
 Benashvili (ბენაშვილი)
 Benia (ბენია)
 Baghushvili (ბაღუშვილი)
 Beria (ბერია)
 Beridze (ბერიძე)
 Bestavashvili (ბესტავაშვილი)
 Biniashvili (ბინიაშვილი)
 Bochorishvili (ბოჭორიშვილი)
 Bokuchava (ბოკუჩავა)
 Bolkvadze (ბოლქვაძე)
 Botkoveli (ბოტკოველი)
 Burchuladze (ბურჭულაძე)
 Bobokhidze (ბობოხიძე)
 Bukia (ბუკია)
 Bukhrashvili (ბუხრაშვილი)
 Bitsadze (ბიწაძე)
 Basilia (ბასილია)
 Beriashvili (ბერიაშვილი)

C (ჩ, ჭ)
 Chabukiani (ჭაბუკიანი)
 Chachkhiani (ჩაჩხიანი)
 Chanturia (ჭანტურია)
 Chankseliani (ჩანქსელიანი)
 Charkviani (ჩარკვიანი)
 Chavchavadze (ჭავჭავაძე)
 Cherkezishvili (ჩერქეზიშვილი)
 Chiaureli (ჭიაურელი)
 Chichua (ჩიჩუა)
 Chikovani (ჩიქოვანი)
 Chkadua (ჭკადუა)
 Chkonia (ჭყონია)
 Chkhetidze (ჩხეტიძე)
 Cholokashvili (ჩოლოყაშვილი)
 Chakhunashvili (ჩახუნაშვილი)
 Chkhaidze (ჩხაიძე)
 Chkheidze (ჩხეიძე)
 Chutkerashvili (ჩუტკერაშვილი)
 Chikhladze (ჩიხლაძე)
 Chkhaberidze (ჩხაბერიძე)
 Chavchanidze (ჭავჭანიძე)

D (დ)
 Davarashvili (დავარაშვილი)
 Dolaberidze (დოლაბერიძე)
 Dadiani (დადიანი)
 Dadeshkeliani (დადეშქელიანი)
 Darchidze (დარჩიძე)
 Darsalia (დარსალია)
 Davitaia (დავითაია)
 Davituliani (დავითულიანი)
 Dgebuadze (დგებუაძე)
 Diasamidze (დიასამიძე)
 Dolidze (დოლიძე)
 Donauri (დონაური)
 Dongvani (დონღვანი)
 Dzhugashvili (ჯუღაშვილი)

E (ე)

 Eristavi of Aragvi (არაგვის ერისთავი)
 Eristavi of Guria (გურიის ერისთავი)
 Eristavi of Racha (რაჭის ერისთავი)
 Esadze (ესაძე)
 Evgenidze (ევგენიძე)
 Eminadze (ემინაძე)
 Emiridze (ემირიძე)

G (გ, ღ)
 Gogrichiani (გოგრიჭიანი)
 Gabunia (გაბუნია)
 Givradze (გივრაძე)
 Gogolauri (გოგოლაური)
 Gabashvili (გაბაშვილი)
 Gabisonia (გაბისონია)
 Gagua (გაგუა)
 Gakharia (გახარია)
 Gandzieli-Gegelia (განძიელი-გეგელია)
 Garakanidze (გარაყანიძე)
 Garsevanishvili (გარსევანიშვილი)
 Gamkrelidze (გამყრელიძე)
 Gamsakhurdia (გამსახურდია)
 Gaprindashvili (გაფრინდაშვილი)
 Gedevanishvili (გედევანიშვილი)
 Geladze (გელაძე)
 Gelovani (გელოვანი)
 Gelashvili (გელაშვილი)
 Gigashvili (გიგაშვილი)
 Giorgadze (გიორგაძე)
 Giorgashvili (გიორგაშვილი)
 Giorgobiani (გიორგობიანი)
 Giunashvili (გიუნაშვილი)
 Glonti (ღლონტი)
 Gloveli (გლოველი)
 Gogoladze (გოგოლაძე)
 Gogniashvili  (გოგნიაშვილი)
 Gotsiridze (გოცირიძე)
 Gruzinsky (გრუზინსკი)
 Gugunava (გუგუნავა)
 Gulordava (გულორდავა)
 Guramishvili (გურამიშვილი)
 Gurgenidze (გურგენიძე)
 Guruli (გურული)
 Gurieli (გურიელი)
 Gvazava (გვაზავა)
 Guluashvili  (გულუაშვილი)
 Gvasalia (გვასალია)
 Ghurtskaia (ღურწკაია)
 Gogolidze (გოგოლიძე)
 Gorjoladze (გორჯოლაძე)
  Gobejishvili  (გობეჯიშვილი)
 Gugeshashvili (გუგეშაშვილი)
 Gochitashvili (გოჩიტაშვილი)

I (ი)
 Iakobidze (იაკობიძე)
 Iakobashvili (იაკობაშვილი)
 Iarajuli (იარაჯული)
 Iashvili/Yachvili (იაშვილი)
 Iluridze (ილურიძე)
 Imedashvili (იმედაშვილი)
 Iosava (იოსავა)
 Ioseliani (იოსელიანი)
 Ivanishvili (ივანიშვილი)

J (ჯ, ჟ)

 Jambakur-Orbeliani (ჯამბაკურ-ორბელიანი)
 Jalagonia (ჯალაღონია)
 Jaliashvili (ჯალიაშვილი)
 Jananashvili (ჯანანაშვილი)
 Janashia (ჯანაშია)
 Jandieri (ჯანდიერი)
 Japaridze (ჯაფარიძე)
 Jaqeli (ჯაყელი)
 Javakhishvili (ჯავახიშვილი)
 Javrishvili (ჯავრიშვილი)
 Jajanidze (ჯაჯანიძე)
 Jeladze (ჯელაძე)
 Jibuti (ჯიბუტი)
 Jinjikhashvili (ჯინჯიხაშვილი)
 Jishkariani (ჯიშკარიანი)
 Jorjadze (ჯორჯაძე)
 Juansheriani (ჯუანშერიანი)
 Jughashvili (ჯუღაშვილი)
 Janezashvili (ჯანეზაშვილი)

K (კ, ქ, ყ, ხ)
 Kochiashvili (ყოჩიაშვილი)
 Kakhaberidze (კახაბერიძე)
 Kakhidze (კახიძე)
 Kalichava (ყალიჩავა)
 Kapanadze (კაპანაძე)
 Kasradze (კასრაძე)
 Kaukhchishvili (ყაუხჩიშვილი)
 Kazbegi (ყაზბეგი)
 Kereselidze (კერესელიძე)
 Kashibadze (ქაშიბაძე)
 Kaldani (ქალდანი)
 Kartskhia (ქარცხია)
 Kharaishvili (ხარაიშვილი)
 Khardziani (ხარძიანი)
 Kherkheulidze (ხერხეულიძე)
 Khetaguri (ხეთაგური)
 Khidirbegishvili (ხიდირბეგიშვილი)
 Khimshiashvili (ხიმშიაშვილი)
 Khinkalidze (ქობულაერრბუ)
 Khinchagashvili(ხინჩაგაშვილი)
 Khinchegashvili(ხინჩეგაშვილი)
 Khinchigashvili(ხინჩიგაშვილი)
 Khomeriki (ხომერიკი)
 Khutsishvili (ხუციშვილი)
 Khurtsidze (ხურციძე)
 Khujadze (ხუჯაძე)
 Khurtsilava (ხურცილავა)
 Kiknadze (კიკნაძე)
 Kipiani (ყიფიანი)
 Kobakhia (კობახია)
 Kobakhidze (კობახიძე)
 Kobalia (ქობალია)
 Kobulashvili (ქობულაშვილი)
 Kochakidze (ქოჩაკიძე)
 Kodoshvili (კოდოშვილი)
 Koridze (ქორიძე)
 Kotrikadze (კოტრიკაძე)
 Kvaratskhelia (კვარაცხელია)
 Kvernadze (კვერნაძე)
 Kublashvili (კუბლაშვილი)
 Kulumbegashvili (ყულუმბეგაშვილი)
 Kurdgelashvili (კურდღელაშვილი)
 Kurdgelia (კურდღელია)
 Kurtanidze (კურტანიძე)
 Kvekvetsia (კვეკვეცია)
 Kutateladze (ქუთათელაძე)
 Kavtarashvili (ქავთარაშვილი)
 Kavtaradze (ქავთარაძე)
 Kandelaki (კანდელაკი)
 Kobaladze (კობალაძე)
 Kobalava (კობალავა)

L (ლ)
 Labadze (ლაბაძე)
 Lazarashvili (ლაზარაშვილი)
 Licheli (ლიჩელი)
 Leonidze (ლეონიძე)
 Liparteliani (ლიპარტელიანი)
 Lobzhanidze (ლობჟანიძე)
 Lortkipanidze (ლორთქიფანიძე)
 Lomidze (ლომიძე)
 Lomtatidze (ლომთათიძე
 Laliashvili (ლალიაშვილი)
 Laghidze (ლაღიძე)
 Loladze (ლოლაძე)
 Lomaia (ლომაია)

M (მ)
 Monavardisashvili (მონავარდისაშვილი) 
 Machabeli (მაჩაბელი)
 Machavariani (მაჭავარიანი)
 Machutadze (მაჭუტაძე)
 Magalashvili (მაღალაშვილი)
 Maisuradze (მაისურაძე)
 Mamaladze (მამალაძე)
 Manvelishvili (მანველიშვილი)
 Mgeladze (მგელაძე)
 Mchedlishvili (მჭედლიშვილი)
 Mdivani (მდივანი)
 Melikishvili (მელიქიშვილი)
 Melkadze (მელქაძე)
 Melua (მელუა)
 Menteshashvili (მენთეშაშვილი)
 Meskhi (მესხი)
 Mikeladze (მიქელაძე)
 Mikelashvili (მიქელაშვილი)
 Mildiani (მილდიანი)
 Mkheidze (მხეიძე)
 Museliani (მუსელიანი)
 Mukhraneli (მუხრანელი)
 Mzhavanadze (მჟავანაძე)
 Murtazashvili (მურთაზაშვილი)

N (ნ)

 Nakani (ნაკანი)
 Nakashidze (ნაკაშიძე)
 Navrozashvili
 Nanava (ნანავა)
Nareklishvili (ნარეკლიშვილი)
 Nemsadze (ნემსაძე)
 Nikoladze (ნიკოლაძე)
 Nikolashvili (ნიკოლაშვილი)
 Nikolaishvili (ნიკოლაიშვილი)
 Nioradze (ნიორაძე)
 Nizharadze (ნიჟარაძე)
 Nogaideli (ნოღაიდელი)
 Nozadze (ნოზაძე)
 Narsidze (ნარსიძე)

O (ო)

 Oboladze (ობოლაძე)
 Obolashvili (ობოლაშვილი)
 Ochiauri (ოჩიაური)
 Oniani (ონიანი)
 Orbeliani (ორბელიანი)
 Okinashvili (ოკინაშვილი)
 Okropiridze (ოქროპირიძე)
 Orjonikidze (ორჯონიკიძე)

P (ფ, პ)

 Pachulia (ფაჩულია)
 Pankvelashvili (ფანქველაშვილი)
 Palavandishvili (ფალავანდიშვილი)
 Papaskiri (პაპასკირი)
 Pataraia (პატარაია)
 Patarava (პატარავა)
 Patarkatsishvili (პატარკაციშვილი)
 Pertakhia (პერტახია)
 Pavlenishvili (ფავლენიშვილი)
 Pavliashvili  (ფავლიაშვილი)
 Petradze (ფხტრაძე)
 Petriashvili (ფხტრიაშვილი)
 Pirtskhalaishvili (ფირცხალაიშვილი)
 Pkheidze (ფხეიძე)
 Peradze  (ფერაძე)

R (რ)

Rapava (რაფავა)
Razmadze (რაზმაძე)
Revazishvili (რევაზიშვილი)
Rekhviashvili (რეხვიაშვილი)
Rokva (როყვა)
 Rusieshvili (რუსიეშვილი)
Rukhadze (რუხაძე)

S (ს, შ)
 Svanadze (სვანაძე)
 Saakadze (სააკაძე)
 Saakashvili (სააკაშვილი)
 Sabauri (საბაური)
 Samadalashvili (სამადალაშვილი)
 Sanikidze (სანიკიძე)
 Saralidze (სარალიძე)
 Shaburidze (შაბურიძე)
 Sakandelidze (საკანდელიძე)
 Shalikashvili (შალიკაშვილი)
 Shengelia (შენგელია)
 Shervashidze (შერვაშიძე)
 Shetekauri (შეთეკაური)
 Shevardnadze (შევარდნაძე)
 Shiolashvili (შიოლაშვილი)
 Shishniashvili (შიშნიაშვილი) 
 Shvelidze (შველიძე)
 Sichinava (სიჭინავა)
 Sidamon-Eristavi (სიდამონ-ერისთავი)
 Sikharulidze (სიხარულიძე)
 Sologashvili (სოლოღაშვილი)
 Spanderashvili (სპანდერაშვილი)
 Stepanishvili (სტეფანიშვილი)
 Sukhishvili (სუხიშვილი)
 Shushania (შუშანია)
 Svanidze (სვანიძე)

T (თ, ტ, წ, ც)

 Tabagari (თაბაგარი)
 Tarkhnishvili (თარხნიშვილი)
 Tavdgiridze (თავდგირიძე)
 Tsetskhladze (ცეცხლაძე)
 Tsereteli (წერეთელი)
 Tsintsadze (ცინცაძე)
 Tsitsishvili (ციციშვილი)
 Tsiklauri (წიკლაური) 
 Tskitishvili (ცქიტიშვილი)
 Tsulukidze (წულუკიძე)
 Tomadze (თომაძე)
 Tomashvili (თომაშვილი)
 Toreli (თორელი)
 Tugushi (ტუღუში)
 Tumanishvili (თუმანიშვილი)
 Tusishvili (ტუსიშვილი)
 Tavkhelidze (თავხელიძე)
 Tsenteradze (ცენტერაძე)
 Titilokashvili (თითილოკაშვილი)
 Tvauri (თვაური)

U (უ)
Uchaneishvili (უჩანეიშვილი)
 Ujmajuridze (უჯმაჯურიძე)
 Undiladze (უნდილაძე)
 Urushadze (ურუშაძე)
 Urjumelashvili  (ურჯუმელაშვილი)

V (ვ)

 Vachnadze (ვაჩნაძე)
 Vakhvakhishvili (ვახვახიშვილი)
 Vardanidze (ვარდანიძე)
   Vardiashvili   (ვარდიაშვილი)
 Vezirishvili (ვეზირიშვილი)
 Virsaladze (ვირსალაძე)

Z (ზ, ჟ)
 Zambakhidze (ზამბახიძე)
 Zalkaliani (ზალკალიანი)
 Zamtaradze (ზამთარაძე)
 Zandaradze (ზანდარაძე)
 Zakarashvili (ზაქარაშვილი)
 Zakareishvili (ზაქარეიშვილი)
 Zakariadze (ზაქარიაძე)
 Zibzibadze (ზიბზიბაძე)
 Zumadze (ზუმაძე)
 Zurabashvili (ზურაბაშვილი)
 Zurabishvili (ზურაბიშვილი)
 Zurabiani (ზურაბიანი)
 Zhorzholiani (ჟორჟოლიანი)
 Zhozhikashvili (ჟოჟიკაშვილი)
 Zhvania (ჟვანია)
 Zoidze (ზოიძე)
 Zotikishvili (ზოტიკიშვილი)
 Zviadadze (ზვიადაძე)

See also 
Georgian surname
List of Georgian princely families

Georgian-language surnames